St Joseph's College, Coleraine was a Roman Catholic secondary school located in Coleraine, County Londonderry, Northern Ireland. Named after St. Joseph, there was a statue of St. Joseph when entering the building.

The school opened in 1961 and was closed in 2019 after 58 years. St. Joseph's merged with Loreto College, Coleraine. 

Pupils from year 10 transferred to either Loreto College or Dominican college, Portstewart two years before the closure. Pupils from years 9, and 12 stayed in the St Joseph's Building until its closure in 2019. The final Principal of the school was Mrs. Mary Miller.

Beresford Campus  
Northern Regional College will use the former St Joseph's College building during the refurbishment of their Union Street campus in Coleraine.  

Secondary schools in County Londonderry
Catholic secondary schools in Northern Ireland
Defunct Catholic schools in Northern Ireland